Bird at St. Nick's was a live tape recording by Charlie Parker.

Track listing
 I Didn't Know What Time It Was 2:35	 
 Ornithology	3:27	 
 Embraceable You 2:18	 
 Visa	2:57	 
 I Cover the Waterfront 1:44	 
 Scrapple from the Apple 4:34
 Star Eyes/52nd Street Theme 3:02	 
 Confirmation	3:18
 Out of Nowhere 2:17
 Hot House	3:45
 What's New	2:43	 
 Now's The Time	4:14	
 Smoke Gets In Your Eyes/52nd Street Theme	4:46

References

1950s albums